The Common Informers Act 1623 (21 Jac 1 c 4) was an Act of the Parliament of England.

The whole Act was repealed by section 2 of, and Schedule 2 to, the Statute Law Revision Act 1959.

Section 1
In this section, the words from "after the end" to "session of Parliament" were repealed by section 1 of, and Schedule 1 to, the Statute Law Revision Act 1948.

Section 5
In this section, the words from "nor to any suit" to "poundage, wooll, &c." were repealed by section 1 of, and Schedule 1 to, the Statute Law Revision Act 1948.

See also
Common informer

References
Halsbury's Statutes,

Acts of the Parliament of England
1623 in law
1623 in England